Marie-Louise Ayres is a librarian whose work has centered on providing digital access to cultural resources throughout Australia. Since 2017 she has been the Director-General of the National Library of Australia.

Early life and education
Marie-Louise Ayres was born in 1963 in Perth Western Australia, and moved with her family to Canberra in 1967. She attended St Clare's College and Stirling College.

Ayres earned her bachelor degree from the University of New England. She received a doctorate in 1994 from the Australian National University, writing her thesis on Australian women poets Dorothy Auchterlonie, Rosemary Dobson, Dorothy Hewett, and J.S. Harry.

Library career
In 1994 she became the curator of the Australian Defence Force Academy's collection of Australian literary manuscripts. Ayres worked there for eight years; her time there included the development of AustLit: The Australian Literature Resource, a clearinghouse for information about Australia's literary and print-culture history.

Ayres began working at the National Library of Australia in 2002 as a project manager for Music Australia, a discovery service for access to music resources. She became curator of the library's manuscript division in 2006 and became head of the resource sharing division in 2011. Her position as the Assistant Director-General included managing Trove, a search engine which aggregates resources from cultural institutions across Australia.

In March 2017 Ayres succeeded Anne-Marie Schwirtlich as Director-General of the National Library of Australia, being appointed for a five-year term. Upon her appointment the Arts Minister praised her work in leading the development of transformative digital services in Australia.

Her work continues to focus on providing access to the cultural history of Australia and addressing the challenges of preserving born-digital content.

Believing in the importance of the legal deposit system as a way to capture the country's identity, Ayres has presided over the building phase and launch of NED, the National edeposit service whereby publishers submit their digital publications directly via a website to fulfill their legal deposit obligations. The nationwide service went live on 30 May 2019, and was formally launched by the Arts Minister Paul Fletcher, on 16 August 2019.

References

Living people
1963 births
Australian librarians
Australian women librarians
University of New England (Australia) alumni
Australian National University alumni
People from Perth, Western Australia
People from Canberra
Directors-General of the National Library of Australia
National Library of Australia Council members